Bhanwar Singh Bhati (born 1 January 1974) is an Indian politician who is serving as the Minister of State for Power (Independent Charge), IGNP, Water Resource Department, Government of Rajasthan. As member of the Indian National Congress party, he has represented the Kolayat assembly seat of Rajasthan since 2013.

Family and education
Bhanwar Singh Bhati was born in Hadan village of Bikaner district in Rajasthan. He is a Rajput by caste. He is the son of Rughnath Singh Bhati.

Political career
In the 2013 Legislative Assembly elections, Bhati won from the Kolayat seat.

References

Living people
Indian National Congress politicians
Rajasthan MLAs 2018–2023
1974 births